Veronica Rotin is the first album by the Maltese child singer, Veronica Rotin. It was recorded in 2014 by Elton Zarb at FreeTime Studios and contains 14 tracks of cover versions, mostly songs that he has sung in singing competitions and on Maltese TV. It was released by Ironic PR & Artist Management, of Marsa, Malta.

Track listing

References 

2014 albums